Sensaura, a division of Creative Technology, was a company that provided 3D audio effect technology for the interactive entertainment industry.
Sensaura technology was shipped on more than 24 million game consoles and 150 million PCs (on soundcards, motherboards and external USB audio devices).
Formed in 1991, Sensaura developed a range of technologies for incorporating 3D audio into PC's and consoles.

History

Following its origin as a research project at Thorn EMI's Central Research Laboratories ("CRL", based in Hayes, United Kingdom) in 1991, Sensaura become a supplier of 3D audio technology. By 1998, Sensaura had licensed its technology to the audio chip manufacturers (ESS Technology, Crystal Semiconductor/Cirrus Logic and Yamaha), who at that time supplied 70% of the PC audio market.  Subsequent licensees included NVIDIA, Analog Devices, VIA Technologies (expired, replaced by QSound) and C-Media Electronics.

In 1993, Sensaura released a CD sampler disc 'beyond stereo...' containing four tracks;

1. Roadside

2. Railway Station

3. RAF Band

4. Falla: Final Dance from "The Three-Cornered Hat"

These tracks, recorded live, were intended to illustrate what could be achieved in terms of 3D sound from a two-channel stereo set-up.

Some commercial recordings followed:

 Milla Jovovich, The Divine Comedy (1994)
 Gustav Mahler: Symphony No. 9, Benjamin Zander, Philharmonia Orchestra (1999)

The MacRobert Award was presented to Sensaura by the Royal Academy of Engineering in 2001.

Sensaura technology was shipped on more than 24 million game consoles and 150 million PCs (on soundcards, motherboards and external USB audio devices). As well as being licensed directly for the first Microsoft Xbox hardware, the technology was also available as a middleware product, GameCODA, for the Xbox, Sony PlayStation 2 and Nintendo GameCube.

In 2000, Sensaura developed a spatial audio plugin for the WinAmp media player which was downloaded 18 million times.

In December 2003, the Sensaura business and IP portfolio was bought by Creative Technology. Sensaura continued to operate as an R&D division within Creative, however following a major reduction in staff numbers in March 2007, it ceased supplying audio technologies for PC sound cards, game consoles but focused on other product areas, including involvement with the OpenSL ES standard.  Following further headcount reductions in 2008, the remaining Sensaura engineers were absorbed into Creative's 3DLabs subsidiary.

Prior to the acquisition of Sensaura by Creative Technology in 2003, some employees left to form Sonaptic Ltd. Licensing Sensaura's technology, Sonaptic specialized in 3D positional audio for mobile devices. In 2007, Wolfson Microelectronics acquired Sonaptic, wanting to expand their reach within the audio market.

Technology

Sensaura 3D Positional Audio (S-3DPA)
Sensaura's 3D positional audio technology was designed to build upon the industry standard Microsoft DirectSound3D API, which allowed games to have high quality audio in three dimensions.
 HRTF 3D audio positioning with low CPU usage.
 Virtual Ear features common HRTF profiles (libraries) that can be selected by the end-user.
 Digital Ear is a process of tuning HRTF filter libraries to the individual's ear shape by creating a CAD model with physical implementation.
 MacroFX simulates 'near-field proximity effects' when objects move very close to the listener.
 ZoomFX to simulate sounds of a specific size instead of a point source.

3D speaker technology
By using MultiDrive 5.1 and XTC cross-talk cancellation, Sensaura's 3D speaker technology can create accurate 3D audio within a normal 5.1 surround sound system.
 XTC cross-talk cancellation for 3D from speakers (as opposed to from headphones). 
 Independent HRTF calculation for surround speakers to give full 3D audio from 5.1
 MultiDrive 5.1 integrates front and rear sound hemispheres on 5.1 speaker setups.
MultiDrive simulates 3D sound on 4 speaker setups

gameCODA (audio middleware)

For more information, see gameCODA.

Further reading
iXBT Labs - Which Sound Card is right for you?
Sensaura - VirtualEar technology
Sensaura - DigitalEar technology
Sensaura - MacroFX Algorithms
Sensaura - MacroFX 2.0
Sensaura - ZoomFX for 3D Sound
Sensaura - XTC cross-talk cancellation
Sensaura - MultiDrive 5.1
Sensaura - MultiDrive (4 speaker)
Sensaura - EnvironmentFX
GameCODA - About
GameCODA - Concepts Guide - Issue 2.0 (All Platforms)
GameCODA - Introductory FAQ - Issue 2.0 (All Platforms)
SoundMAX Technical Notes

Compatible hardware

Consoles & PC's (gameCODA)
GameCODA is able to run on virtually any x86 PC with basic sound support.
Personal computers (PC's)
Microsoft Xbox
Sony PlayStation 2
Nintendo GameCube

Sound cards (S-3DPA)
Sound cards that support S-3DPA can also be utilized to accelerate gameCODA.
Audiotrak Prodigy 7.1
Diamond Monster Sound MX400
M-audio Revolution 7.1

Turtle Beach
Turtle Beach Catalina
Turtle Beach Santa Cruz

Hercules (Guillemot)
Guillemot Maxi Sound Muse
Hercules Game Theater XP
Hercules Gamesurround Muse 5.1 DVD
Hercules Gamesurround Fortissimo III 7.1
Hercules Digifire 7.1

Yamaha YMF7x4 series
YMF724C-V
YMF724F-V
YMF730
YMF738
YMF744
YMF744B-R
YMF754 DS-1E

Terratec
Terratec Aureon 7.1 Space
Terratec Aureon 7.1 Universe
Terratec DMX 6Fire
Terratec Promedia SoundSystem DMX

Motherboards with semiconductors
ASUS
ASUS P4S800 series
ASUS P4B533-X
ASUS A7V266-MX
ASUS A7V8X-X (on audio models only)

Semiconductors
Analog Devices Inc: AD1881A, AD1885, AD1886, AD1887, AD1980, AD1985 (SoundMAX)
C-Media: CMI 8768 (SoundPro)
Realtek: ALC658
VIA: VT1616, VT1618, (Vinyl Audio, Vinyl Tremor)

See also 
AC'97 (Audio Codec)
Aureal Semiconductor
Creative Technology
GameCODA
OpenSL ES
Sound card
Sonaptic Ltd
(NVIDIA) SoundStorm

References

External links 
Creative Technology
Institute of Professional Sound
Modern Audio Technologies in Games

Sound cards
Creative Technology
Creative Technology acquisitions